Vernessa Ann Mitchell (born January 1, 1959) is an American contemporary Christian and gospel recording artist whose vocal versatility has been heralded by R&B and House audiences.

Early life
Mitchell was born on January 1, 1959, in Columbus, Georgia, as one of Ten siblings, whose father was a preacher.
Mitchell was raised in Pasadena, California. Vernessa Ann Mitchell is a contemporary Christian and Gospel
recording artist whose vocal versatility has been heralded by
R&B and House audiences.
She began her career at the young age of 16, after being
discovered by Berry Gordy of Motown Records. She and three
other young ladies became a teen girl group called High Inergy
and were signed by the label during the late ‘70s. Their first
album went gold and produced the hit single “You Can’t Turn
Me Off (In The Middle of Turning Me On).”
The group was featured on American Bandstand, Soul Train
and television shows hosted by Merv Griffin, Dina Shore, and
Mike Douglas. Billed as the next-generation Supremes, they
worked with noted artists, such as Stevie Wonder, Smokey
Robinson, Michael Jackson.
Vernessa's solo debut album, “This Is My Story”, was released in
1985 and quickly established her as a singer's singer. The title cut on the project garnered Grammy
and Dove Award nominations.
The 1987 follow-up album, "Higher Ground" became the impetus for nonprofit ministry, Higher Ground Ministries.  That title single became her signature song as it gained nationwide airplay by Gospel disc jockeys.  The project also featured hits such as "Rise and Shine" and "Trust in the Lord".
Her sophomore music project, “On A Mission”, which included the hits “Stand Up and Be Counted” and
“Someone Loves You”, was much anticipated and built upon the success of “Higher Ground” and her
critically acclaimed live performances that included presidential inaugurations and Salvation Army
youth crusades. However, it was her 1992 release, “Destiny”, which won the hearts of urban
audiences throughout America and gained the attention of Dick Clark Productions and The Christian
Athletic Association.
“Destiny” acquired crossover success as its driving urban tone aggressively crossed religious barriers.
Hits such as “Reap” and “You Took My Life” caught the ear of renowned DJ, Junior Vasquez; and
were remixed –becoming anthems within major urban clubs throughout the United States, Europe
and South America. Vernessa's voice became a soaring instrument of hope and joy as her music
climbed the Billboard charts.
Singles such as “Took My Life” which peaked at number one on the Dance Music/Club Play charts
and “Love Will Find A Way” peaking at number five, were followed by more than a dozen singles that
dominated the dance charts from 1999 to 2010. Her single, “This Joy,” went triple platinum and was
declared to be the most influential dance song of 1999.
An ordained evangelist, Vernessa established Higher Ground Ministries in 1985, and traveled both
nationally and internationally sharing the good news with thousands of pastors and congregations
through word and song. She has had opportunity to minister on national platforms with renowned

Career

Mitchell began her career at the young age of 15, after being discovered by Berry Gordy of Motown Records. She and three other young ladies became a teen girl group called High Inergy and were signed by the label during the late 1970s. Their first album went gold and produced the hit single "You Can’t Turn Me Off (In The Middle of Turning Me On)".

The group was featured on American Bandstand, Soul Train and television shows hosted by Merv Griffin, Dinah Shore, and Mike Douglas. Billed as the next-generation Supremes, they worked with noted artists, such as Stevie Wonder, Smokey Robinson, and Michael Jackson.

Mitchell's solo debut album, Higher Ground, was released in 1985 and quickly established her as a singer's singer. The title cut on the project garnered Grammy and Dove Award nominations.

The 1987 follow-up album, On A Mission, which included the hits "Stand Up and Be Counted" and "Someone Loves You" was much anticipated and built upon the success of Higher Ground and her critically acclaimed live performances that included presidential inaugurations and Salvation Army youth crusades. However, it was her 1992 release, Destiny, which won the hearts of urban audiences throughout America and gained the attention of Dick Clark Productions and The Christian Athletic Association.

Destiny acquired crossover success as its driving urban tone aggressively crossed religious barriers. Hits such as "Reap" and "You Took My Life" caught the ear of DJ Junior Vasquez; and were remixed – becoming anthems within major urban clubs throughout the United States, Europe and South America.

Singles such as "Took My Life", which peaked at number one on the Dance Music/Club Play charts, and "Love Will Find A Way", peaking at number five, were followed by nearly a dozen singles that dominated the dance charts from 1999 to 2010. Her single, "This Joy", went triple platinum and was declared to be the most influential dance song of 1999.

Billboard charts

Although she had success as a gospel/CCM artist, Mitchell has also done well as a gospel dance diva. Her uplifting house songs have charted seven times on Billboard's Hot Dance Music/Club Play with gospel/inspirational themed dance songs "Reap (What You Sow)" (#19/1996), "This Joy" (#5/1998), "Issues" (#12/2000), "Serious" (#37/2003), "Took My Life" (#2/2004; #1 Club Play track in 2004 year-end chart) and "Accept Me"(#1/2005). Mitchell's 2006 single, "Love Will Find A Way" peaked at #5 on the Hot Dance Music/Club Play chart.

Discography

Albums
 This Is My Story (1985) Top Gospel Albums #19
 Higher Ground (1988) Top Gospel Albums #32
 On a Mission (1990) Benson
 Destiny (1992) A&M
 Let Your Presence Fall (1998) Priority Sound
 Love Is The Message (2010) Continuous Cool

Singles
 "Reap (What You Sow)"
 "This Joy"
 "Higher"
 "Serious"
 "Took My Life"
 "Accept Me"
 "Trouble don't last always" 
 "Love Will Find A Way"
 "Rise!"

See also
List of number-one dance hits (United States)
List of artists who reached number one on the US Dance chart

References

External links
Vernessa Mitchell's website

1959 births
American dance musicians
American women singers
American house musicians
American soul singers
American gospel singers
Musicians from Pasadena, California
Living people
Singers from California
American women in electronic music
21st-century American women